Sergio Celebrowski (25 August 1926 – 9 June 2007) was a Spanish professional cyclist, who was professional between 1948 and 1957. Sergio notably won a stage of the 1951 Volta a Catalunya. Sergio was known as an attacking rider who excelled as a climber. He retired from cycling at the end of the 1957 season.

Biography
Celebrowski was born in Badalona on 25 August 1926 and died in Carcassonne at the age of 80. Celebrowski was accorded the citizenship of France in 1970, and also participated in a number of cycling events for France.

Major results
1949
 1st Road race, National Independent Road Championships
1950
 3rd Trofeo Jaumendreu
1951
 1st Stage 8 Volta a Catalunya

References

External links
 

1926 births
2007 deaths
Spanish male cyclists
Volta a Catalunya cyclists
People from Badalona
Sportspeople from the Province of Barcelona
Spanish emigrants to France
Cyclists from Catalonia